= Olatunji Akinosi =

Nigerian politician and engineer

Olatunji Akinosi Akanni

Member of the House of Representatives
- Incumbent
- Assumed office 2023
- Constituency: Ado-Odo/Ota

Personal details
- Born: 15 February 1969 (age 57) Ogun State, Nigeria
- Party: All Progressives Congress
- Occupation: Politician, engineer

Olatunji Akinosi Akanni (born 15 February 1969) is a Nigerian politician and engineer. He has represented the Ado-Odo/Ota Federal Constituency of Ogun State in the House of Representatives since 2023 as a member of the All Progressives Congress.

== Political career ==
Akinosi was elected to represent Ado-Odo/Ota Federal Constituency in the House of Representatives in the 2023 Nigerian general election on the platform of the All Progressives Congress.
